Jirisan is a South Korean television series starring Jun Ji-hyun and Ju Ji-hoon. It is named after the eponymous mountain in South Korea and has been promoted as "tvN's 15th Anniversary Special Drama". It premiered on tvN on October 23 to December 12, 2021 and aired every Saturday and Sunday at 21:00 (KST). The series is  available for streaming on iQIYI worldwide, and on Viki and Netflix in selected territories.

Synopsis 
Set against the backdrop of towering views of Mount Jiri, it depicts the story of rangers and other employees of the Jirisan National Park who climb through the mysterious and unexplored regions of the mountain, trying to rescue the survivors and lost trekkers. The drama is centered around a mystery surrounding the mountain's many visitors - those who come to kill, and those who come to end their lives.

Cast

Main 
 Jun Ji-hyun as Seo Yi-kang
 Kim Do-yeon as teenager Seo Yi-kang
 Kang Ji-woo as young Seo Yi-kang
 Nicknamed "Mountain Ghost God" and "Devil Seo" by her colleagues, she is the park's top ranger, who instinctively knows how to navigate the trails of the mountains. Her experience has made her knowledgeable enough to track down a lost hiker based on just a single leaf or blade of grass. In spite of this, she views the mountain as a dreadful place and had yearned to leave, but eventually stayed for her grandmother. Her cynical view of the mountain begins to change after she meets rookie ranger Hyun-jo, to whom she becomes a partner and confidante. She is 35-38 years old through the series.
 Ju Ji-hoon as Kang Hyun-jo
 A military academy graduate who once rose to the rank of a captain. He harbors a deep secret that he cannot tell anyone. After encountering an incident on Mount Jiri, he began to see incomprehensible visions of deaths occurring on the mountain. Believing this is the mountain's calling for him to save them, he becomes a ranger. As he travels the mountains with senior ranger Yi-kang, they become true partners to the extent of entrusting each other with their own lives. He later discovers something terrifying hidden in Mount Jiri, and this begins to alter his view of the beautiful mountains, and the people there. He is 34-37 years old through the series.

Supporting

Haedong Branch and Bidam Shelter 
 Sung Dong-il as Jo Dae-jin
 The head of the branch office of the park who has spent most of his life working as a park ranger. He is honest to a fault and has a strong sense of duty for his job. Despite being widely respected as a ranger, he had failed to be there for his family when they needed him. His family eventually left him, and the mountain is all he is left with. So he further dedicates his life to rescuing others and sees the lives of his subordinates as his responsibility.
 Oh Jung-se as Jung Goo-young
 An extremely realistic ranger who lives by the motto, "I need to take care of myself before I can take care of others". As such, he makes sure to take all his vacation days, does his job right on the clock and disappears right before he's dismissed. Under the surface, he has a good heart and has a deep camaraderie with the other rangers.
Jo Han-chul as Park Il-hae, the ranger team leader.
 Joo Min-kyung as Lee Yang-sun
 Go Min-si as Lee Da-won, a rookie ranger.

Jeonbuk Office 
 Lee Ga-sub as Kim Sol, a park volunteer
 Joo Jin-mo as Kim Gye-hee
 Kim Gook-hee as Dr. Yoon Su-jin

People in Haedong Village 
 Kim Young-ok as Lee Moon-ok, Yi-kang's grandmother and owner of a restaurant in the village
 Jeon Seok-ho as Kim Woong-soon, a police officer
 Han Dong-ho as Park Soon-kyung

Extended 
 Yoon Ji-on as Se-wook
 Son Suk-ku as Lim Cheol-kyeong
 Choi Hyun-wook as teenager Lim Cheol-kyeong

Special appearance 
 Park Hwan-hee as Hee-won, Climbers visiting Jirisan National Park 
 Seo Hye-won as Hong Young-mi
 Kim Min-ho as Kim Ki-chang
 Ryu Seung-ryong as Narrator
 Ye Soo-jung as Geum-ri
 Lee Chae-kyung as Il-man's wife, the president of a health center who makes a living by illegally catching snakes.
 Choi Go as Il-man's son and his mother is the president of a health center.
 Gong Sung-ha as Jung Soo-min
 Ji Seung-hyun as Kim Nam-sik, Former Rangers of Jirisan National Park
 Yoon Jong-suk as Tae-joo
 Jo Wan-ki as Kim Jae-gyeom
 Lee Sun-bin as Kang Seung-ah, Kang Hyun-jo's sister
 Kim Kap-soo as Kang Oh-hyeon, Kang Hyun-jo's father
 Nam Gi-ae as Lee Hyun-sook, Kang Hyun-jo's mother

Production 
Jirisan is created by director Lee Eung-bok and writer Kim Eun-hee. Writer Kim Eun-hee based the story of Jirisan on her interviews with national park workers. Kim said in an interview, "When I wrote Jirisan at the beginning, it didn't focus on rangers. I was more interested in stories about mountaineers. However, I was more intrigued about their work after interviewing them."

On March 3, 2020, it was reported that Jun Ji-hyun was in talks to star in Kim Eun-hee's new television series. On September 4, it was officially confirmed that Jun would star alongside Ju Ji-hoon. Sung Dong-il and Oh Jung-se officially joined the main cast on September 10. Principal photography for the drama began on September 18, 2020, at Sannae-myun in Namwon, Jeonbuk. The first outdoor shoot was held on October 29. Production was halted from December 8 to 20 due to the rise in COVID-19 cases in South Korea. Filming was completed in June 2021. Jirisan is the first television series to be filmed at Jirisan National Park.

On September 25, 2021, tvN announced the series would air from October 23, on Saturdays and Sundays at 21:00 (KST).

Original soundtrack

All credits were adapted from Melon.

Part 1

Part 2

Part 3

Part 4

Part 5

Part 6

Part 7

Part 8

Part 9

Part 10

Part 11

Part 12

Viewership
A 9.1% viewership rating was recorded nationwide for the series' first episode, making it the highest premiere rating on the network for a series on its first season, and the second overall after Hospital Playlist 2.

References

External links 
  
 Jirisan at AStory 
 Jirisan at Studio Dragon 
 
 
 Jirisan on iQIYI
 Jirisan on Viki

TVN (South Korean TV channel) television dramas
2021 South Korean television series debuts
2021 South Korean television series endings
South Korean action television series
South Korean mystery television series
South Korean horror fiction television series
Television shows written by Kim Eun-hee
Television series by Studio Dragon
Television series by AStory
Television productions suspended due to the COVID-19 pandemic